Tiger Hill  (Suzhou Wu: Hou chieu) is a hill in Suzhou, China. It is a tourist destination that is known for its natural environment and historic sites. The hill's  name is said to come from the fact it looks like a crouching tiger. Another legend states that a white tiger appeared on the hill to guard it following the burial of King Helü. The hill is also sometimes referred to in parallel with "Lion Mountain", another hill near Suzhou which resembles a sitting lion.

History

According to the Historical Records, the King of Wu Helu was buried on the hill, called then "the Hill Emerging from the Sea". The legend goes that three days after his burial a white tiger appeared squatting on the hill. Hence the name. Tiger Hill boasts impressive rocks, deep dales, three matchless scenes, nine suitable occasions for enjoyment, 18 scenic spots, and changing scenery at all times. No wonder it has been an awe-inspiring sight in the area south of the Lower Yangtze. The Yunyan Temple Pagoda and the Sword Pool are well-known features of the hill. With a history going back more than 1,000 years, the simple, archaic and imposing Yunyan Temple Pagoda, also known as the Second Leaning Tower on earth, stands aloft at the top of the hill, serving as a symbol of ancient Suzhou for years, The Tomb of the Wu King Helu under the Sword Pool has remained an unsolved mystery for two and a half millennia. The story goes that the great Jin master Wang Xizhi traded his calligraphy for lovable geese from the Taoist Abbot. The windy vale and cloudy spring are said to make the visitor reluctant to leave.

Tourism
The hill has been a tourist destination for hundreds, if not thousands, of years, as is evident from the poetry and calligraphy carved into rocks on the hill. Its features include:
Sword-Testing Rock: a rock in two pieces that was supposedly cleaved cleanly by a legendary sword of extraordinary sharpness.
Spring of Simplicity and Honesty: a well that, according to legend, first appeared as a spring to an exhausted monk carrying water up the entire length of the hill.
Sword Pond (Jianchi): a small rectangular pond, beneath which a treasure of some 3,000 swords are believed to have been buried; It is believed that the Wu King Helu was buried next to the lake wall. Efforts excavating the site were made in the 1950s, but eventually were stopped because the archeologists found the Leaning Pagoda's foundations resting on the site.
Lu Yu Well: a well attributed to Lu Yu, author of the first book on tea.
Thousand People Rock: a rock-based plaza at the bottom of the leaning tower plaza. Legend says after the burial of Wu King Helu, his son, the successor of the throne, commanded the murder of some thousand craftsmen who were involved in his father's burial in order to conceal the exact location of the grave.
Penjing/Bonsai Collection and Museum.
Wanjing Villa: contains more than 600 bonsai and has two display areas, a tree stump bonsai and water-stone bonsai.

See also
List of Chinese gardens
Penjing
Suzhou

References

External links

More Tiger Hill Photos

Tourist attractions in Suzhou
AAAAA-rated tourist attractions
Gusu District